The 2018–19 Dayton Flyers women's basketball team represented the University of Dayton during the 2018–19 NCAA Division I women's basketball season. The Flyers, led by third-year head coach Shauna Green, play their home games at UD Arena and were members of the Atlantic 10 Conference. They finished the season 17–14, 10–6 in A-10 play to finish in a tie for fourth place. They advanced to the semifinals of the A-10 women's tournament where they lost to VCU. They received an at-large bid to the WNIT where they lost to Northwestern in the first round.

Media

Dayton Flyers Sports Network
The Dayton Flyers Sports Network will broadcast Flyers games off of their athletic website, DaytonFlyers.com, with Shane White on the call. Most home games will also be featured on the A-10 Digital Network. Select games will be televised.

Roster

Schedule

|-
!colspan=9 style=| Exhibition

|-
!colspan=9 style=| Non-conference regular season

|-
!colspan=9 style=| Atlantic 10 regular season

|-
!colspan=9 style=| Atlantic 10 Women's Tournament

|-
!colspan=9 style=| WNIT

Rankings
2018–19 NCAA Division I women's basketball rankings

See also
 2018–19 Dayton Flyers men's basketball team

References

Dayton
Dayton Flyers women's basketball seasons
Dayton
2018 in sports in Ohio
2019 in sports in Ohio